Roswell Conspiracies: Aliens, Myths & Legends is an animated television series that originally aired as part of BKN's cartoon programing block.  The show's premise was that aliens had been living among humans for ages, and were the origins of many of the creatures humans know from myth, folklore and legends, including vampires and werewolves. The show was produced in part of BKN's drive to reinvent itself as a children's block and company in general.

In October 2019, it was announced that 41 Entertainment would produce an eight-episode computer-generated animation reboot of the series, which was scheduled to premiere in fall 2021.

Overview 
On the show, the Roswell incident which is part of a conspiracy theory is portrayed as being a man made phenomenon. It was set up by humans to deflect popular attention from the truth. The unidentified flying object was a prop; the body of a little green or grey man was a dummy; the witnesses to the crash were plants; as were the Air Force investigators. In fact the whole shadow world surrounding Area 51 was nothing but a distraction from the fact that the aliens had landed long ago and there were known incidents of their desire to attack, assimilate and/or destroy the human race.

These known incidents could be found in legend, myth and folklore of beings so strange and alien that they became the fabric of what human beings thought of when they thought of being frightened; vampires, werewolves, banshees, manitou, evil spirits, etc. As human beings progressed into the Industrial Age the attacks seemed to lessen, but recently they'd begun to go on the rise.

The story begins as Nick Logan, a bounty hunter, gets tapped to hunt down what he thinks is a regular bounty, but things don't stay regular for long. When his next bounty turns out to be a very unusual girl, he soon finds himself involved in something both incredibly outrageous but also potentially satisfying.  There are aliens among us and he can possibly play a part in helping to protect the earth. His new circumstances could also help him discover the truth behind his biological father's disappearance. Raised and trained by a stepfather in the know, Nick is one of a few human beings born with an innate sense of seeing through alien deceptions; most of the aliens can morph into human form at will. This ability gives him a unique advantage. In time he discovers his father and grandfather shared this advantage too.

Nick ends up teaming with Sh'lainn Blaze, a rogue Banshee who wants to be the bridge that helps humans and her species co-exist on the planet together. The Banshee haven't fared well in an age of cold iron and Sh'lainn seems aware that they are plotting some form of 'final' solution. Together they become agents under James Rinaker the current Executive Officer of The Global Alliance, an international agency responsible for keeping the secret from the public and keeping the aliens in check by preventing the more aggressive and volatile ones from hunting human beings.

Characters

Main characters

Nick Logan (Alex Zahara): Former bounty hunter now newest Global Alliance Agent and part of the Detection Unit. Logan's father, Walter, disappeared during an unexplained alien encounter at Roswell, New Mexico; his grandfather was one of the original members of the Alliance. Nick was raised by his step-father never knowing at the time that his "play time" was secret training to fight aliens. Nick is capable of seeing through alien illusions. Nick is a rogue within the Alliance, seldom following procedure and taking many actions upon his own accord. Nick spends most of the series looking for his kidnapped step-father and searching for information on his real father's disappearance.

Sh'lainn Blaze (Janyse Jaud): A rebellious member of the Banshee clan, a race of aliens that landed in the British Isles around 527 BC. She, like her kind, possesses the ability to predict when someone will die. She can also levitate and emit energy streams. She's been targeted by Queen Mab. She becomes a new member of the Alliance and Nick's partner in the Detection Unit. As the series progresses it is clear that Nick and Sh'lainn develop a relationship. She ultimately forms a psychic bond with Nick when she brings his lost memories to the surface.

James Rinaker (L. Harvey Gold): The head of the Global Alliance and the executive responsible for staging the Roswell Incident. Rinaker is committed to protecting humans from the aliens among them and to preserving the secrecy of the Alliance - at any cost. Throughout the series Rinaker's agenda is to wipe out hostile alien factions and makes alliances with his enemies whenever it involved weakening another foe. This served only to further divide and weaken the alien factions. Toward the end of the series it is revealed that he is actually a Shadoen double agent and sub-commander named Wraith. He killed the real Rinaker in 1946 and absorbed his biological tissue to replicate his DNA. Wraith assumes complete command of the Shadoen Multitude when Keel's ship was misled into underestimating the humans and is hit by a nuclear warhead. Wraith is killed when the second Shadoen Multitude fleet is wiped out by the EMP bomb.

Jefferson Trueblood (Eli Gabay): Sheriff of Roswell. He is the leader of the S.T.A.R. teams and Rinnaker's right-hand man. He is very skillful in combat and in the use of weapons. Trueblood's father was also one of the original members of the Global Alliance. Trueblood became the chief of his tribe following his great uncle, One Fox's, death during a Lycanthrope attempt to eradicate another alien race, the Kachina. He fights honorably and although he normally obeys Rinaker, he will take matters into his hands if he feels Rinaker's orders risk the lives of others. Rinaker's actions ultimately cause Trueblood to distrust the general and, at one point he stole the Lycanthrope EMP bomb from Rinaker and moved it to the vision cave at his native home in Arizona. When Rinaker reveals himself to be Shadoen, Trueblood intercedes when he is about to kill Nick. He sacrifices himself while fending off Wraith to allow Nick to escape.

Nema Perrera (Saffron Henderson): Recruited from Egyptian National Security. She's a weapons specialist who is paired with Fitz in the Detail Unit. Very logical and practical but with enough of a sense of humor to play Fitz's straight man in their friendly snarking. Her father is an archaeological professor and her mother is a geneticist and biologist who studies blood and body tissue from Egypt's mummies. It is also revealed that her family is descended from Egypt's Old Kingdom dynasties.

Simon "Fitz" Fitzpatrick (Peter Kelamis): An Ex-CIA agent with a wild imagination and the ability to convince anyone of anything. Fitz's assignment in the Detail Unit is to cover up any and all evidence of alien activity or the existence of the Alliance. Despite the fact he's not fully trained for combat, he comes across as easy going, slightly goofy, and can handle himself if the situation demands it.

Alliance operatives
Ti-Yet (Dale Wilson): A Guardian among the Yeti. He was responsible for the safety of his people and protecting their most valued possession from their sworn enemies. He eventually becomes integrated as an agent of the Alliance and becomes a great friend to Nick.  First appearance: Episode 3 - Mountain Retreat.

Ms. Smith-Heisen: She is the liaison between the Alliance and the government, acting as sort of a director, but not superior to general Rinaker. She is the first to discover the Shadoen Multitude Fleet approaching the Earth but was incapacitated by Rinikar before he tried to escape.

Keung Ling: A human agent within the Global Alliance with a thirst for power and attention. He temporarily shares control of his body with a Vodun named Babul, which enhances his abilities above the average human. Babul and Ling come to respect one another and act as a team. Babul assumes complete control over Ling to assist the Vodun when they take over the bunker but regrets his actions; Babul ultimately sacrifices himself to destroy the Vodun and to allow Ling to survive.

Dorian Wyrick: A former US marine and a close friend of Trueblood, he is a good soldier and a loyal agent to the Alliance. He rescues Ms. Smith-Heisen after she was assaulted by Rinaker upon discovering the Shadoen Fleet approaching Earth. He also forms part of the team that retrieves the EMP bomb, left in the vision cave by Trueblood.

Prof. Antonio Alascano: The section head among the scientists who develop the weapons, gadgets and vehicles used by the Alliance.

Dr. Marina Petrovic: The Alliance pathologist, an eccentric woman who has the task of eradicating alien viruses or find antidotes to vampires poisons.

Delfin Tabada: One of the most loyal men of Rinaker. He is a militant, grumpy, and rude torture expert put in charge of the Omega Level.

Enemies 

Queen Mab (Saffron Henderson): The leader of the Banshee Clan. Almost a counterpart to Rinaker, she's determined that her people should survive and thrive on Earth - even if it means sabotaging and retarding human innovation, for technology is poisonous to Banshees.  Mab banishes Sh'Lainn from their clan for joining the Alliance, also branding her as a traitor and target.  The conflict with the Alliance as well as bitterness for Sh'Lainn leads Mab to even summon Minotauri warriors - a technological race previously sealed by the Banshee - in order to kill Sh'lainn, but her efforts were thwarted by Nick.  In the end, she forgives Sh'lainn and welcomes her back into the Banshee Sisterhood. First appearance: Episode 1 - The Bait (Part 1).

Ruck (Scott McNeil): The werewolf pack leader. Relentless, resourceful, and a cunning liar, he takes any opportunity to continue his people's war with the Yeti. His only family is his son Athos, with whom he doesn't get along well - because of Athos' appearance and ideology. Ruck is an enemy of the Alliance throughout the series, but ultimately became one of their greatest heroes as he died aiding the new Alliance against the Shadoen's second invasion. Approaching the end of his life cycle, he and Nathan Boyar decided to pilot a hastily crafted ship equipped with an unstable beam cannon to destroy their primary weapon along with many other Shadoen vessels.  First appearance: Episode 3 - Mountain Retreat.

Hanek (Dale Wilson): Vampire Leader of a successful Vampire Family. He is calculating and extremely ambitious. He is blinded in one eye and receives a scar following an attempted coup by the Vampire, Valra. Hanek was killed by Nick Logan while attempting to use the life energies of Banshee to power teleporters. His second-in-command, Dorn, subsequently took over.  First appearance: Episode 7 - The Roswell Incident.

Dorn (Lee Tockar): He is originally appointed by Hanek to assist the Alliance in capturing Valra. He becomes Hanek's second-in-command and takes over Intracom operations after Hanek was killed. His resolve for world domination was not as strong as Hanek's which allows him to consider the possibility of forming an alliance with the other alien races, including the Banshee. First appearance: Episode 23 - Vampire Amok.

Chauf (Richard Newman): A Golem who becomes the leader of the Conduit upon Kao Lin's death during an Alliance raid. He later attempts to bring Athos into the Conduit at his mother's wishes. He is the brains behind managing to get the militant alien races such as the Vampires, the Lycanthropes, and the Banshee, to come together and form a coalition against the Alliance. He commands the flagship of the alien fleet that means to attack the bunker. He halts the attack right before they reach the Alliance when he sees that Walter Logan is alive. He later accompanies the team that infiltrates the Shadoen command ship. First appearance: Episode 13 - The Conduit (Part 1)

Kahn Mort (Scott McNeil): A Minotauri warrior who fights with a battle axe capable shooting lasers or of being used as a hoverboard. He is noticeably sadistic and amoral as a bounty hunter. First appearing when Queen Mab send the Minotauri to kill Sh'lainn, he is teleported back into captivity once he fails to capture her. He reappears during the Banshees' war against the Vampires while in a fragile alliance with the Alliance but seeks out Sh'lainn again once he is set free from his conditional release. After trying to kill Sh'lainn again for the bounty by Queen Mab, he is teleported into space and freezes beyond Earth's orbit. First appearance: Episode 9 - Bounty Wars.

Charon (Dale Wilson): A Minotauri warrior who fights with a sword and shield. His sword is capable of energy blasts while his shield can be used as a hoverboard. He competes with Kahn Mort for the Sh'lainn's head in exchange for his freedom. In the middle of the hunt, he encounters and is defeated by Nick Logann, who leaves his body in the bushes for Alliance agents to find while using Charon's armor to impersonate him and take the bounty off Sh'lainn's head. First appearance: Episode 9 - Bounty Wars.

Sh'rain: Daughter of Queen Mab, she is a close friend of Sh'lainn and is sympathetic to her even after her defection to the Alliance. Upon hearing how Sh'lainn begins suffering from the Iron Death, she give Nick Logan an Ur stone to cure her.

Valra (Venus Terzo): A vampire scientist who ultimately defects from Hanek. She almost successfully takes over Intracom when she alters her genetic structure and bites Sh'lainn. As a Banshee hybrid she was able to emit projectiles and was no longer affected by the Sun. She was imprisoned by the Alliance after her failed coup, and her powers wear off. Valra is among the aliens that are set free by Trueblood shortly before the bunker explodes.

Setakha: An ancient winged Vampire from Egypt who is the son of Set. In ancient times, he and his father controlled the Upper Kingdom while using the Pharaohs as puppets. Consequentially, he was regarded as a malevolent deity and known as the Master of Pharaohs. He was later sealed in stasis for four thousand years before being reawakened by the other Vampires with a special Ankh shaped key and Nema's blood. He then reactivates his robotic guardian, the Sphinx, to wreak havoc in Egypt with the intent of activating an ancient but inactive enslavement beacon to control mankind before he is disintegrated in his beacon's activation beam.

Baron Samedi (Paul Dobson): He is the leader of the Vodun, perpetually scheming to have his minions use living humans as hosts in order to launch a Vodun invasion. When he is captured and cryogenically frozen within the bunker, Agaza and Babul plot to free him by overrunning the alliance, using alliance operatives as hosts. He is ultimately killed when his own subordinate Babul reveals that high frequencies would kill the Vodun, allowing Sh'lainn to use her banshee scream.

Agaza: She is Samedi's right hand and possesses a humanoid panther body. She flees the bunker before Sh'lainn uses her Banshee scream. She tries to start up Vodun activity again at a chemical plant but is ultimately captured and imprisoned by the Alliance.

Babul: The Vodun that shares a body with Keung Ling. While initially capitalizing on Ling's thirst for physical power in order to infiltrate the alliance, he comes to understand the human conscience. This makes him question the Vodun agenda and ultimately causes him to betray his own people. He reveals the Vodun's weakness to hypersonic sound and dies in penance alongside the other Vodun when Sh'lainn unleashes a banshee scream at a high frequency.

Jerich: The equivalent of Superman, he is one of the last surviving members of the Argonians, an alien race that was conquered by the Shadoen. Like Vampires, he possesses a technological based shapeshifting ability in order to appear human. His true form is a yellow and bulbous humanoid with red antennae and his weakness is a golden element known as Argonium. He came to Earth to warn its inhabitants of the invading Shadoen and later gives his life to protect the Earth when the Shadoen attack the team assigned to retrieve the EMP bomb.

Su-Ak: Previously the leader/guardian of the Sasquatch, he was upstaged by Ti-Yet during a revolt on a Lycanthrope slave ship. He later betrayed Ti-Yet by releasing the lycanthropes in order to kill him, but ended up inadvertently killing the remaining members of the Sasquatch race. He blamed the Yeti for the tragedy, but ultimately realized that he had caused his people's deaths and committed suicide by falling off a waterfall.

Chupacabra: A vampire agent named Davorak that bites Rinaker (posing as Walter Logan in 1979 in an attempt to frame The Alliance for bombing a Conduit safe house). He is physically mutated into the Chupacabra and his cognitive reasoning is somewhat diminished. He preys on  live stock and uses his venom to make dometistic animals attack Intracom workers that are leveling the Amazon rainforest. He is found by Nick Logan and tries to reveal information on the Shadoen but is killed by Rinaker (using an Intracom ship to frame the Vampires) before he can do so.

Spot: A Sun Spot alien that was spirited away from the Sun by vampires centuries earlier. He eventually escaped and burrowed to the Earth's core for sustainence and doesn't return to the surface until the recent development of nuclear plants. Spot is the cause of the Chernobyl and Three Mile Island accidents. Sh'lain understands his docile nature and protects him. Rinaker allows Spot to stay at the bunker and feed off the fusion reactor. He sacrifices himself to stabilize the reactor when Rinaker sets the bunker to self-destruct, and in the process he almost takes Rinaker with him.

Kao Lin: A tan skinned and grey haired alien with an Asiatic motif, he was the previous leader of the Conduit. He fought with a staff and was aware that someone was posing as Walter Logan while attacking the Conduit in the past. He loses his life holding off Alliance operatives for Nick and the Conduit to escape when he is shot in the back in the middle of a duel with Trueblood. Another one of his kind was seen in Numbered Days Part 1.

The Tribune: An alien that visited Earth during the times of ancient Greece, and was known to humans as Prometheus the fire-giver. He returns to Earth to reveal the Roswell Conspiracy by giving news reporter Carl McGavin a data disk that would enlighten the human race. His plans are interceded by the Alliance, though Nick questions Rinaker's actions against the Tribune. Rinaker incarcerates the Tribune because of his knowledge on Rinaker's true identity. The Tribune is among the aliens that are set free by Trueblood shortly before the bunker explodes. He provides the New Alliance with detailed information on the power of the Shadoen's linked formation.

Keel: The Shadoen Multitiude Fleet Commander. He was led by sub-commander Wraith into underestimating the humans, which ultimately leads to his demise when the U.S. government responds to Keel's ultimatum by launching nuclear warheads at Keel's ship.

Other characters 
Nathan Boyer (Dale Wilson): When the real Walter Logan disappears in 1979, Rinaker appoints Nate to pretend to be Walter Logan. He comes to love Nick as if he were his own son, and without Rinaker's knowledge, indirectly teaches Nick to combat aliens such as Werewolves and Vampires. When Nick is grown up, Nate retires as an agent but continues to pose as Walter Logan and is admitted into a retirement home due to his heart condition. When Nick's memories begin to return Nate reveals that he is actually Nick's stepfather. Shortly afterwards, Intracom kidnaps Nate. Nick spends most of the series searching for Nate, finding him and losing him multiple times. When the new Alliance is formed to defend Earth from the Shadoen invasion, Nate apologizes to Walter for playing into Rinaker's hand. He atones for his actions when he and Ruk decided to pilot a hastily crafted ship equipped with an unstable beam cannon to destroy their primary weapon along with many other Shadoen vessels. First appearance: Episode 1 - The Bait (Part 1).

Wi-Yoom: A female Yeti, she is Ti-Yet's mate and leader of the Yeti once he is captured and later conscripted into the Alliance. She was first seen when she and the other Yeti are forced to evacuate their original underground village in the Himalayas with the EMP bomb once the Lycanthrope attack. After the EMP bomb is taken back by the Lycanthrope, she contacts the Alliance in order for Ti-Yet to deactivate it as it was inadvertently activated during the firefight.

Athos: Losing his mother due to Alliance anti-Lycanthrope action shortly after his birth, he is secretly raised by Nick and Sh'lainn. Due to the Lycanthropes' natural ability to simulate human appearance from visual information during childhood, Athos bears a striking resemblance to Nick, whom he imprinted on as a father-figure shortly after his birth. Having found out that Logan and Sh'lainn were keeping a Lycanthrope, the Alliance kidnaps Athos for study, thus leading to a brief conflict with Nick, resulting in Athos being returned to his real father, Ruck.  Athos is one of the few Lycanthropes in the show that do not seek war, same as Kara, his late mother, who wished for him to join the Conduit. After his father's heroic sacrifice, it is presumed that Athos assumed new leadership of the werewolf pack. First appearance: Episode 18 - The Cub.

Kraker: A close friend of Nick and his informant from his days as a bounty hunter. A very skilled hacker, he is very useful as a son of a gun of non-Alliance tainted information.

Walter Logan (Dale Wilson): Nick Logan's father and someone with insider knowledge of the Alliance. He was also the founder of the Conduit and wanted humankind to peacefully coexist with the other alien races. He was kidnapped by the Shadoen posing as General Rinaker, and put into cryogenic stasis in the Omega Level of the Alliance's maximum security prison at the Bikini Atolls. Later on, he was freed by his son, Nick, and was instrumental in forging a new Alliance between humans and aliens.

Alien races
Aesiri (AKA Viking gods): The Aesiri come from a gravity-heavy planet via a comet centuries ago. Due to the condition of their homeworld, their bodies can withstand much more punishment than any other species. The Aesiri are notoriously sadistic and psychopathic, enjoying causing both physical and psychological torture. While the Aesiri cannot shapeshift, they can project mental holograms into the minds of others, and seemingly take others’ forms. Two Aesiri, Odin and Loki, were being held in the Alliance maximum security containment facility in the Bikini Atoll. They escaped and planned to use a Frost Giant to initiate Ragnarök only to perish when the Frost Giant fell into a ravine of lava.

Argonian: A race of yellow and bulbous humanoids with red antennae that inhabited a planet known as Argonius, a planet that was conquered by the Shadoen. They possessed the ability of flight, enhanced strength, as well as heat vision but were susceptible to a yellow element known as Argonium. Little is known about their technological state, but they were known to use technology that was advanced enough to make them shapeshift like the Vampires.

Banshee: A race of female humanoid teleporters who live in harmony with the Earth, but are poisoned by humanity’s growing dependence on electronics. Banshee can predict when someone will die, and can fire energy bursts or fly. They are most well known for their ability to produce piercing shrieks. They also have lifespans ranging for hundreds or thousands of years, and have been on Earth since they landed in Ireland around 527 BC. This race is in constant warfare with the Vampire Empire, which is fundamentally their ideological opposite - draining life and using technology. One interesting trait is that a banshee can initiate a deep mind probe into another person to retrieve lost memories. However, such a process will form a permanent bond between their life forces. This can be considered as the banshee version of marriage. Sh'lainn and Nick form this bond in order for him to regain his lost memories. As evidenced in one episode, a Banshee who spends too much time around technology contracts a sickness known as the "Iron Death", which causes her to go wild as she transforms technology into organic material and directs it against others. Though initially deemed incurable by Mab, her daughter, Sh'rain, later reveals that an Ur stone can counter this sickness. A Banshee is also weakened when in space, due to her power being drawn from the Earth. The race is tied to the Tree of Light in their hidden lair, and its destruction would also bring about the deaths of every Banshee.

Cerberus: A three headed parahound android that can track a target anywhere in the world.  The Minotauri use Cereberus to hunt their prey. One was used to track down Sh'lainn but was then trapped by Logan and disassembled.

Conduit: The Conduit is a confederation of members from many different alien races. Its main purpose is to safely move aliens throughout the planet and relocate survivors of the inter-species wars. Colonel Walter Logan was an influential force in negotiations with the Conduit, until he apparently set off a bomb at a Conduit safehouse, killing dozens of aliens. The Conduit is considered an enemy of the Global Alliance. It is eventually revealed that the bombing of the safehouse was caused by a Shadoen agent posing as Walter, as an attempt to destabilize relations between the Alliance and the aliens.

Cyclops:  Enormous black mechanical giants with a single red eye, they were constructed by the Titani, and sent to Earth to protect the planet from the Shadoens. They possess the ability to mind control and to fire lasers from their eyes. In addition to being the basis for the Cyclops myths, another member was known as the basis for the myth of the giant automaton known as Talos. The Cyclops successfully defended the planet in the 15th century BC, using a long range beam cannon to destroy a Shadoen fleet, but the blast also wiped out the Aegean civilization (Atlantis: the most prosperous human culture at the time) by causing an unintended tsunami. A cyclops was later reactivated and tried to fire a massive beam cannon on the island of Santorini at a second Shadoen invasion, but it was destroyed along with the cannon by the Alliance, under the manipulation of Rinaker.

Frost Giant: An alien snake that came from the Aesiri's homeworld, the Frost Giants can fire a beam that absorbs all energy (including life) while freezing the said target on impact. While dangerous, they possess no sapience and require an Aesiri linked to its nervous system to direct them. The Banshee imprisoned one in stasis centuries ago in Iceland. But it was later released by the Aesiri & forced the Alliance to kill it by making it fall into a ravine of lava.

Fusion Breed: Not an alien race per se, but a hybrid created by crossing Shadoen DNA with earthling ants. By using ants as the subject of the experience, a large number of hybrids could be born by means of the ant queen, though most of them were wiped out by Logan on Episode 8 - Fusion Breed.  However, they were not completely obliterated and a few eggs were used to recreate the experiment. The hatchlings were then frozen in stasis in the Omega Level alongside Walter Logan and were released in an attempt by Rinaker to prevent the Logans from escaping. However, they were drown by sea water when Nick flooded the prison.

Golem: Creatures of living stone. The Conduit alien resistance is currently led by a Golem named Chauf.

I.E.D Units: A humanoid robotic assassin constructed by the Shadoen. It is designed to infiltrate any known fortress, execute a designated biological target and its offspring, and detonate to ensure all traces of it and its victims are wiped out, hence the acronym. In addition to possessing active camouflage, the ability to fire lasers, regeneration, limb morphing, and tracking down targets with a long range biological scanner, it is practically indestructible. After Walter Logan was kidnapped 22 years ago, an IED unit was discovered and apparently targeting Nick Logan (though its actual target was Rinaker - whether it was intended to kill Wraith or the original Rinaker is unknown). It was disable by straining its power core from continuous week-long combat with an extremely high casualty rate as a result. Years later, it was unintentionally activated by Sh'lainn and Nick before wreaking havoc in the bunker and ultimately being forced to self-destruct by Sh'lainn overloading its reactor.

Fauns: A race of green or white-furred anthropomorphic goats.  Unlike their legendary counterparts, female pans exist and the race is not as hedonistic as in Greek myths, such as engaging in marriage and raising families.

Kachina: A mysterious and musical race, the Kachina, along with another benevolent being called the Spider Woman, reside in a parallel universe slightly out of sync with our own. Physically, they resemble four armed and cloaked humanoids with heads that can be described as a mix between a moth and a bird. They form a central part in the lives of Trueblood's tribe, a fictional Pueblo tribe known as the Chirauc, and send rain whenever the chief requests for it in the vision cave. The Lycanthrope attempted to capture one for a mysterious benefactor, and then eradicate the rest in Ep 33: Rain.

Lycanthrope (AKA Werewolves): Sapient, humanoid wolves that have the biological ability to change their appearance into human form. The Lycanthrope used one of two EMP charges to reverse the magnetic polarity of the Yeti homeworld and destroy it. They were the slave masters of both the Sasquatch and the Yeti before they rebelled. Lycanthrope have an eight to ten year life span, and because of this they grow at an incredibly accelerated rate compared to humans. They are very close to their father or paternal figure when they are growing. Shortly after birth Lychanthropes imprint on a human, and then gain the ability to shapeshift to look like that particular human.

Minotauri: Armored warriors with the body of a man and the head of a bull. Apparently, one of these is the Minotaur of Greek legend. The Minotauri lost a war with the Banshee, and as a result, all of the surviving Minotauri were frozen in stasis.

Oni: The Oni resemble the demons of Japanese mythology and are characterized with horns, sharp teeth, various skin colors, and four arms. Oni have biological shapeshifting abilities, and the majority of the Oni race play a large part in Japanese organized crime. Most Yakuza operations are directed by the Oni.

Sasquatch: A long-lived race similar to the Yeti and resided on their same home world, although they dislike the cold climates the Yeti find comfortable. The Sasquatch were slaves along with the Yeti, but were regarded as inferior by them. Physically they are brown and are slightly smaller compared to their cousins and the males lack the horns found in their Yeti counterparts. During an escape attempt from the Lyncathrope slave ships, almost all of the Sasquatch were massacred indirectly due to Su-ak's betrayal of Ti-yet 250 years ago. They are believed to be extinct after Su-Ak commits suicide.

Shadoen: The Shadoen Multitude is a highly advanced hostile species that devote themselves to the enslavement or destruction of other races. They are an insectile/crustanean race divided into various castes and are led by an Elder Council on their homeworld. They are also known to be treacherous to both others and members of their own species as seen with Wraith's betrayal of Commander Keel. They are also only willing to colonize planets that meet specific criteria, such as Earth, and are known to have an aversion to oxygen (a reason why they are responsible for instigating the deforestation of the Amazon), as stated in Episode 10 - Chupacabra. A common tactic that they use to subjugate a newly discovered planet is to use a combined fleet to fragment its moon with a laser while letting the fallout devastate the local species. Contrary to races such as the Lycanthropes - who have an innate mimetic system - or the Vampires - who use holographic technology - the Shadoen are not shapeshifters. In order to acquire the target race appearance, the Shadoen imprint their DNA and memories on a human clone, in so becoming an exact replica of the victim (which is also why Logan's eyes can't detect them). After the assimilation, the Shadoen can not freely morph to its former original shape, having to maintain the target guise or forfeit it by triggering a Shadoen DNA bomb.  Once activated, the DNA bomb restores the agent to its full-fledged Shadoen form, permanently destroying the previous target guise in the process. This ability has permitted the Shadoen to successfully infiltrate the human race. The Shadoen are by far more powerful and resilient than the other alien races seen on the show: they also possess a mild ability of regeneration, and their blood has a poisonous effect if ingested, as witnessed in Episode 10 - Chupacabra. They attempted to conquer Earth during the 15th century BC but their fleet was repulsed by a long range beam cannon sent to Earth by the Titani. Their second invasion is thwarted by the efforts of the new alien-human Alliance with the use of the Lycanthrope EMP bomb. First appearance: Episode 14 - The Conduit (Part 2).

Siren: Blue or green skinned and green haired female humanoids with red eyes. Their song is hypnotic and they emit bright multi colored lights for while singing. One is seen as a member of the Conduit.

Sun Spots: Giant green and radioactive creatures with spots in their back. They resemble slugs with the head and forelimbs of salamanders and dwell on the surface of the Sun. They feast off of radiation and heat. Some time in the past, the Vampires captured one named Spot and sought to use it as a power source only for it to break free and escape.

Titani: A peaceful race, which constructed the Cyclops and sent them to protect Earth from the Shadoen Multitude. First mentioned on Episode 28 - When Giants Walked the Earth.

Tribune: An alien race that visited Earth during the times of ancient Greece. One was known to humanity as Prometheus, the giver of fire. They are a small green-skinned humanoids with tentacle-like forearms that are known for their intellect, intelligence gathering, and their use of crystal based technology (including cloaked reconnaissance satellites armed with lasers and human size exo-suits armed with ray pistols). They also had previous experience with the Shadoen and sent one of their number to Earth to assist in repelling the invasion.

Vampire: The Dark Empire of the vampires is broken into families, each acting with a certain level of autonomy. True to legend, vampires can be killed by direct exposure to sunlight. However, wooden stakes do no more harm to a vampire than to anyone else. First appearing in South America (where they established a colony), the Vampires are mainly a technological and business orientated race, which doesn't have any regard for nature, often clashing with the Banshees. The Vampires are also amoral about life and are known to use the Banshees as "batteries" for their teleporters.  Several major vampire families, headed by Hanek, created the multi-national corporation Intracom, which they use to fund their wars against the Banshee and the Alliance. Vampires possess basic shapeshifting technology permitting them to change their appearance into human form. A vampire's real form is a large, yellow snake with arms, and a round, human-like, hooded head. Vampires possess a venom that allow them to enslave other races for short periods. There are also known to be a rare breed of winged vampires who were associated with Ancient Egypt during the Old Kingdom.

Vodun: Slug-like parasites that can only live within the bodies of the dead. Vodun hosts are able to see in the dark and regenerate flesh. Vodun have been on this planet for approximately three hundred years. When the Vodun try to possess a living person, the two minds merge and drive each other insane, rendering the host and Vodun useless. Alliance Detection teams report that the Vodun may be trying to create the technology needed for their race to inhabit living beings. They were later able to perfect their assimilation process and were nearly successful in taking over the Alliance from within. Fortunately, they were killed by a hyper sonic scream by Sh'lainn while the survivors were rounded up in raids.

Yeti: Often referred to as an “abominable snowman”, the Yeti are a humanoid race that live high in the mountains of the Himalayas. They are physically larger than humans and possess three digits on each hand and two on each foot. In addition, males are known to possess horns while they and their relatives, the Sasquatch can live for centuries. The Lyncathrope destroyed the magnetic polarity of their home planet with an EMP bomb - rendering it lifeless, and took them as slaves. When the Lycanthrope neared Earth 250 years ago to enslave the native humans, the Yeti overpowered their captors alongside the Sasquatch and escaped with the Lycanthrope's second EMP bomb. Agent Ti-yet is a member of the Yeti race, and his status in the Alliance is necessary due only to the knowledge he has of the Lycanthrope EMP bomb.

Episodes

Credits 
Co-created by Kaaren Lee Brown, the show's pilot episode and bible were written by Bob Forward and Greg Johnston, Story Editors. Some sources say it was set up to be shown as either 20 one-hour-long episodes or for each episode to be split in half to equal 40 thirty-minute episodes. Aside from a few dual part episodes, however, the storytelling reads better as 40 separate episodes. There was a production budget from Bohbot of U.S.; $500,000 per episode with a blend of cel animation and special effects at Epoch Ink in Santa Monica, California, with the talents of Joe Pearson, Tom Tataranowicz, Chuck Patton, Brad Coombs, Young Yoon, Harry Warner, Rick Ungar, Brad Rader and Gregg Davidson. Stephanie Graziano produced.

Production 
On April 4, 2001, it was confirmed that the series was picked up by Fox to air on Fox Kids block from April 7th, which the series reran on.

Home Media releases

United States
In 2007, budget distributor Digiview Entertainment released five DVD volumes containing four episodes each, titled "Bounty Wars", "The Bait", "Conduit", "Countdown", and "Area 51".

Plans for a DVD box set, slated for release on July 30, 2007, came and went, with its availability unknown due to problems with retailer support; however, Target carried a $5 box set with episodes 1-20 in early 2010.

As of 2022 the show is available to stream for free on Tubi TV

Germany
The German company Pidax released all 40 episodes on 3 volumes (2 DVDs each) in 2018.

United Kingdom
As of March 9, 2020, the first 20 episodes were made available on Amazon Prime Video UK.

Other media
Roswell Conspiracies: Aliens, Myths and Legends was later adapted into a video game for PlayStation and Game Boy Color on July 13, 2001, just one year after the series had finished its run on June 2, 2000.

The Game Boy Color adaptation was developed by Crawfish Interactive and gives players control of Nick Logan. The game is said to deliver ongoing suspense as any passerby could possibly be an alien. The game has five locations to explore and has ten levels, seven driving games and five Boss Battles.

References

External links

BKN DVD Release #1
 Epoch Ink Animation Series Article 
 Wicked Witch official site

1990s American animated television series
2000s American animated television series
1999 American television series debuts
2000 American television series endings
1990s Canadian animated television series
2000s Canadian animated television series
1999 Canadian television series debuts
2000 Canadian television series endings
American children's animated science fiction television series
American children's animated horror television series
Canadian children's animated science fiction television series
Canadian children's animated horror television series
Television shows adapted into video games
First-run syndicated television programs in the United States
Fox Kids
Fox Family Channel original programming
YTV (Canadian TV channel) original programming
American children's animated action television series
Canadian children's animated action television series
English-language television shows